G. P. Codie's Ground was a cricket ground in Eccles, Lancashire.  The first recorded match on the ground was in 1857, when Manchester Cricket Club played Surrey in the ground's first first-class match.  The following year the ground held its second and final first-class match when Manchester Cricket Club played Sussex.

During its existence, the ground was the home venue of Westerns Cricket Club.  Westerns played the final recorded match held on the ground in 1881 when they played Cheshire. The ground was located at the eastern end of Barton Lane and is today covered by housing.

References

External links
G. P. Codie's Ground on CricketArchive
G. P. Codie's Ground on ESPNcricinfo

Defunct cricket grounds in England
Eccles, Greater Manchester
Cricket grounds in Greater Manchester
Defunct sports venues in Greater Manchester
Sports venues completed in 1857
1857 establishments in England